Jan Hermannus van Reede (12 January 1878 in Zwolle – 15 November 1956 in The Hague) was a Dutch horse rider  who competed in the 1924 Summer Olympics and in the 1928 Summer Olympics. In the 1924 Summer Olympics he finished fourteenth in the individual dressage. Four years later he won the bronze medal in the team dressage with his horse Hans after finishing eighth in the individual dressage.

References

External links
profile

1878 births
1956 deaths
Dutch dressage riders
Equestrians at the 1924 Summer Olympics
Equestrians at the 1928 Summer Olympics
Olympic equestrians of the Netherlands
Dutch male equestrians
Olympic bronze medalists for the Netherlands
Sportspeople from Zwolle
Olympic medalists in equestrian
Medalists at the 1928 Summer Olympics